Jonathan Janson (5 October 1930 – 29 November 2015) was a British competitive sailor and Olympic medalist. He was born in Chelsea. He won a bronze medal in the Dragon class at the 1956 Summer Olympics in Melbourne, together with Graham Mann and Ronald Backus., sailing the Camper and Nicholson built Bluebottle,  which had been a wedding present from the Island Sailing Club in Cowes to Princess Elizabeth  and Prince Philip.

References

1930 births
2015 deaths
British male sailors (sport)
Sailors at the 1956 Summer Olympics – Dragon
Sailors at the 1960 Summer Olympics – Dragon
Olympic sailors of Great Britain
Olympic bronze medallists for Great Britain
Olympic medalists in sailing
Recipients of the Olympic Order
Medalists at the 1956 Summer Olympics